Ordinary Heroes is the ninth studio album by the British pop musician Howard Jones, released on 9 November 2009. A simpler album production than the previous release Revolution of the Heart was present here. Strings and piano dominate, and while there are some upbeat tracks, the album has a mellow, mature atmosphere.
Some of the tracks were performed with the Morrison Orpheus Choir in St David's Hall in Cardiff at a special one-off gig.

Track listing

Standard Version

"Straight Ahead" (Howard Jones, Cori Josias) – 4:13
"Say It Like You Mean It" (Jones, Josias) – 3:35
"Someone You Need" (Jones, Duncan Sheik, Martha Schuyler Thompson) – 3:31
"Collective Heartbeat" (Jones) – 3:48
"Fight On" (Jones) – 4:06
"Even If I Don't Say" (Jones, Josias) – 3:50
"Ordinary Heroes" (Jones, Josias) – 4:33
"You Knew Us So Well" (Jones) – 4:55
"Love Never Wasted" (Jones) – 4:48
"Soon You'll Go" (Jones, Josias) – 4:38

A limited edition 2CD pack was sold exclusively by Jones' website.  The second disc included piano and vocal versions of each track from the standard album, plus two additional songs.

Bonus Disc

"Straight Ahead" 
"Say It Like You Mean It" 
"Someone You Need" 
"Collective Heartbeat" 
"Fight On" 
"Even If I Don't Say" 
"Ordinary Heroes" 
"You Knew Us So Well" 
"Love Never Wasted" 
"Soon You'll Go" 
"Your Heart Has Won" (Jones) - 3:47
"Love Never Wasted (Revisited)" - 4:57

Personnel
 Howard Jones – Steinway piano, lead vocals, musical arrangements, string arrangements
 Robin Boult – guitar
 Martin Cohen – bass
 Jonathan Atkitson – drums
 Vicky Matthews – cello
 Racheal Robson – viola
 Deborah White – 1st violin
 Natalia Bonner – 2nd violin
 Ty Unwin – additional strings on "Soon You'll Go" 
 Fiona Brice – string arrangements, conductor
 Daniel Pierce – backing vocals
 Morriston Orpheus Choir – choir on "Soon You'll Go" 
 Joy Amman Davies – choir conductor

Production
 Produced, recorded and mixed by Robbie Bronniman.
 Recorded at Robot Studios and Level View Studio (Somerset, England).
 Strings recorded by Matthew Lawrence at Assault & Battery and Metropolis Studio (London, England).
 Choir recorded by Stephen W. Taylor in Swansea, Wales.
 Album Artwork – Hush Creative

References

Howard Jones (English musician) albums
2009 albums